William Stanley Molyneux (born 10 January 1944 in Ormskirk, Lancashire, England), is an English footballer who played as a goalkeeper in the Football League for Liverpool and Oldham Athletic. He also played for Northern Premier League side Wigan Athletic, appearing twice in the 1969–70 season.

References

External links
Billy Molyneux's Career

1944 births
Living people
English footballers
People from Ormskirk
Association football goalkeepers
Liverpool F.C. players
Oldham Athletic A.F.C. players
Wigan Athletic F.C. players
English Football League players